Omen is the seventh studio album by American heavy metal band Soulfly. It was recorded in November 2009 and was released first in Japan on May 18, 2010, and on May 25, 2010, in other parts of the world. It was released on May 24, 2010, in parts of Europe. It is the last album to feature bassist Bobby Burns and drummer Joe Nunez who were replaced by Asesino frontman, Tony Campos and former Borknagar drummer David Kinkade in mid-2011. At just over forty and a half minutes, it is the band's second shortest album while the shortest being Archangel at thirty-six and a half minutes.

Background 
Soulfly entered the Edge of the Earth Studios in Los Angeles, California on November 6, 2009, to begin recording their seventh album with Max Cavalera and Logan Mader both producing. Through a series of streaming web video updates, frontman Max Cavalera revealed on November 13, 2009, that the album would be called Omen and would feature guest appearances by Tommy Victor of Prong and Greg Puciato of The Dillinger Escape Plan. Additionally, the album features performances on drums from Max's first son Zyon Cavalera on a b-side cover of Sepultura's "Refuse-Resist" and his youngest son Igor Cavalera Jr. on a cover of Excel's "Your Life, My Life".

The seven figures in album art of Omen (on the standard edition three figures are on the cover, and four are on the back), created by David Ho, are meant to represent that this is Soulfly's seventh studio album. Each of the seven figures, inspired by the fictional Star Wars creatures the Tusken Raiders, were also meant to represent each of the seven deadly sins from what they hold in their hands. In fact, Cavalera saw Ho's stylized depiction of Tusken Raiders created for LucasArts and requested an album cover similar in style.

Reception
Jay H. Gorania of about.com showed good praise about this album, "it is brutal and fast, though not necessarily as intense or interesting as the releases marking Cavalera's early and mid-period work. Yet this is a transition from what has become a mediocre band to one that sounds vital and refreshing." Gregory Heaney of AllMusic said "Omen is like thrash metal comfort food." PopMatters rated this album 5 out of 10 stars, saying "Cavalera sounds more focused than usual, his lyrics are more angry than spiritual, the band leans more towards thrash than nu-metal, and the production keeps things rather simple, clean and loud as all mainstream metal, but always emphasizing the physicality of the rhythm riffing." Sputnik thought this album is great, because it "exhibits the same rough formula but unlike other Soulfly albums these tracks display a higher level of writing style, musical ability and a better use of creative ideas in a more mature and cohesive manner."

Songs
"Rise of the Fallen" features Static-X-like riff with cyber tones, then a sitar signals the beginning of death metal riff. The song features Greg Puciato of The Dillinger Escape Plan. "Great Depression" plays such thrashy riff that it sounded like train derailing, before abruptly settling down into Hellhammer-like riff for chorus. "Kingdom" is a unique song for Soulfly due to melodic vocals by Max Cavalera. "Vulture Culture" is a rhyming song title that has hints of Nailbomb sounds and punky riffs.

Track listing
All songs composed by Max Cavalera, except "Rise of the Fallen" by Max Cavalera and Greg Puciato, "Lethal Injection" by Max Cavalera and Tommy Victor.

Personnel

Soulfly
Max Cavalera - vocals, four-string guitar, sitar
Marc Rizzo - lead guitar, flamenco guitar
Bobby Burns - bass
Joe Nunez - drums, percussion

Additional personnel
Branden Krull - keyboards
Greg Puciato - vocals on "Rise of the Fallen"
Tommy Victor - vocals on "Lethal Injection"
Zyon Cavalera - drums on "Refuse/Resist"
Igor Cavalera - drums on "Your Life, My Life"

Chart performance

See also
Bed Bath & Beyond, the store punned by Bloodbath & Beyond
The Cartridge Family, a Simpson's episode that uses the name "Bloodbath and Beyond" for a fictional store

References

2010 albums
Soulfly albums
Albums produced by Max Cavalera
Roadrunner Records albums
Albums produced by Logan Mader
Albums with cover art by Travis Smith (artist)
Seven deadly sins in popular culture